Robert Emmet's Gaelic Athletic Club Slaughtneil is a Gaelic Athletic Association club based on the townland of Slaughtneil, near Maghera, County Londonderry, Northern Ireland. The club is a member of Derry GAA and competes in Gaelic football, hurling and camogie. The club is named after Irish patriot and revolutionary Robert Emmet and the club plays its home games at Emmet Park.

Slaughtneil have won the Derry Senior Football Championship six times and the Derry Senior Hurling Championship 16 times. Slaughtneil also won their first Derry senior camogie championship in 2012, and has since won three All-Ireland Senior Club Camogie Championship titles. Slaughtneil won "Club of the Year" at the 2000 Ulster GAA Writer's Association Awards.

Codes
The club fields teams in several GAA codes, including hurling, Gaelic football and camogie, with teams in each code winning multiple county and provincial titles between 2013 and 2021.

Hurling
Slaughtneil is one of the most successful clubs in the Derry Senior Hurling Championship, having won 16 county titles, including 10 successive titles between 2013 and 2022.

Gaelic football
As of October 2020, the club had won six Senior County Championship titles. The first of these came in 2004, when Slaughtneil defeated Bellaghy at Watty Graham Park, Maghera. Slaughtneil won their second Derry title in 2014 and their third in 2015. On 30 November 2014, Slaughtneil beat Omagh St Enda's to claim their first Ulster Club Championship. The club went on to win additional Ulster club titles in 2016 and 2017.

Camogie
Slaughtneil fields camogie teams at U6, U10, U12, U14, U16, Minor, and Senior levels. Slaughtneil won the Senior Camogie Championship in 2012 and 2015 and the Derry League in both years. In 2014 and 2015 they won the Ulster League. In September 2021, Slaughtneil's camogie team won its seventh consecutive Derry senior camogie title.

In 2017 they won the All-Ireland Senior Club Camogie Championship, and retained this title in 2018 and 2019.

Honours

Senior football
 Ulster Senior Club Football Championship (3): 2014, 2016 2017
 Derry Senior Football Championship (6): 2004, 2014, 2015, 2016, 2017, 2020.
 Derry Senior Football League (3): 2001, 2013, 2018
Derry Intermediate Football Championship (1): 1982
 Derry Intermediate Football League (1): 1982
 Derry Junior Football Championship (1): 1956
 Larkin Cup (2): 2003, 2013
 McGlinchey Cup (3): 1999, 2001, 2006

Senior hurling
Ulster Senior Club Hurling Championship (4): 2016, 2017 2019 2021 (Runners-up 2000, 2013)
Derry Senior Hurling Championship (16): 1965, 1966, 1968, 1969, 1993, 2000, 2013, 2014, 2015, 2016, 2017 2018, 2019, 2020, 2021, 2022

Senior camogie
 All-Ireland Senior Club Camogie Championship (3): 2017, 2018, 2019 (Runners-up 2020)
 Ulster Senior Club Camogie Championship (5): 2016, 2017, 2018, 2019, 2020.

Notable players
 Patsy Bradley – Former Derry player. Part of Derry's 2002 All-Ireland Minor Football Championship winning side.
 Francis McEldowney – dual player 
 Chrissy McKaigue – Derry footballer and dual club player
 Cormac O'Doherty – Derry U-21 hurler and dual club player
 Brendan Rogers – Derry footballer and dual club player

See also
List of Gaelic games clubs in Derry

References

External links
Slaughneil GAC website

Gaelic games clubs in County Londonderry
Gaelic football clubs in County Londonderry
Hurling clubs in County Londonderry